Nordstromia guenterriedeli is a moth in the family Drepanidae. It was described by Ulf Buchsbaum in 2010. It is found on Sumatra.

The wingspan is 23–27 mm. The ground colour of the wings and body is milk cafe brown. There are black dots at the inner angle and the transverse lines are dark brown and clear. There are three transverse lines from the abdominal margin to the middle of the hindwings.

Etymology
The species is named for Günter Riedel of the Zoologische Staatssammlung München.

References

Moths described in 2010
Drepaninae